Speiredonia alix is a species of moth of the family Erebidae first described by Achille Guenée in 1852. It is found in India, the Andamans, Malaya, Sumatra, Borneo, Java, Sumbawa and the Philippines.

References

External links

Moths described in 1852
Speiredonia